The Wolof Wikipedia is the edition of Wikipedia in the Wolof language. It currently has  articles.

The Wikipedia was started in the beginning of 2005, along with the Bambara Wikipedia and the Fula Wikipedia. Kasper Souren, a Dutchman who worked with Geekcorps, wrote in a report to an open source conference that until 2006 "not much happened" on the Wolof Wikipedia. Up until that year, many small articles with very little content were posted.

In April 2007 Ibrahima Fall (username Ibou), a Senegalese student living in Italy, began adding substantial content to the Wolof Wikipedia. It had 500 articles in November 2007, 543 articles in June 2008, and 1028 articles in August 2015.

References

External links

  Wolof Wikipedia (Mobile)
 Ibrahima Fall (Ibou) speaking about the Wolof Wikipedia (and more) on Senegalese TV. In Wolof.
 "Wolof reaches 1000 Wikipedia articles," Neverness (blog), 30 May 2010

Wikipedias by language
Internet in Africa
Internet properties established in 2005
Wolof language
African encyclopedias